Remix is an album of remixes of various William Control tracks. It was released for free download through NoiseTrade.

Track listing

References

2014 remix albums
Control Records albums
William Control albums